Gurkhaneh or Kyurakhane or Qurkhaneh may refer to:

Gurkhaneh, Qazvin
Gurkhaneh, West Azerbaijan